Marília Mendonça was a Brazilian singer, composer, writer and Latin Grammy Award for Best Sertaneja Music Album winner. She released two collaborative studio albums, six extended-plays, four collaborative extended-plays, four live albums, one compilation album, and fourteen singles.

She started her career in 2014, releasing her homonymous first extended-play at the age of eighteen. In June 2015, Mendonça released her first single "Impasse", featuring the duo Henrique & Juliano. In March 2016, she released her first live album named Marília Mendonça: Ao Vivo, the album was a big success in Brazil, producing hits such as "Sentimento Louco" and "Infiel". In October of the same year, Mendonça released an acoustic extended play, Agora É Que São Elas.

In March 2017, Mendonça released her second live album Realidade, spawning hits like "Amante Não Tem Lar" and "De Quem É A Culpa". In February 2019, she released her last live album Todos Os Cantos, Vol. 1, her most successful project, featuring hits such as "Ciumeira", "Bem Pior Que Eu" and "Todo Mundo Vai Sofrer". Across her career, Marília Mendonça sold over 20 million records in Brazil (in certifications).

Albums

Collaborative albums

Live albums

Compilation albums

Extended plays

Collaborative extended plays

Charted singles

Charted songs

References

Discographies of Brazilian artists
Latin music discographies